Botolph Claydon is a hamlet in the civil parish of East Claydon, in Buckinghamshire, England.

Anciently the hamlet was called Botyl Claydon.  The prefix comes from the Anglo-Saxon word botyl meaning 'house'.  The word Claydon is also Anglo Saxon, and means 'clay hill'.

The village hall, built in 1912, was once the village library and was donated to the villages of East and Botolph Claydon by the Verney Family.

References

Hamlets in Buckinghamshire